Pholiotina cyanopus is a species of fungus that contains psychoactive compounds including psilocybin and the uncommon aeruginascin. Originally described as Galerula cyanopus by American mycologist George Francis Atkinson in 1918. It was transferred to Conocybe by Robert Kühner in 1935 before being transferred to Pholiotina by Rolf Singer in 1950. A 2013 molecular phylogenetics study found it to belong to a group of species currently assigned to Pholiotina that are more closely related to Galerella nigeriensis than to Pholiotina or Conocybe. It is likely that it will be moved to a different genus in the future, but this has not happened yet.

It is very similar to Pholiotina smithii, a species known only from North America, from which it differs slightly in the color of its cap and gills and the width of its cheilocystidia. Some authors have speculated that the P. smithii could be a junior synonym of P. cyanopus, but this has not been confirmed.

Description
Pholiotina cyanopus is a small saprotrophic mushroom with a conic to broadly convex cap which is smooth and colored ocher to cinnamon brown. It is usually less than 25 mm across and the margin is striate, often with fibrous remnants of the partial veil. The gills are adnate and close, colored cinnamon brown with whitish edges near the margin, darkening in age. The spores are cinnamon brown, smooth and ellipsoid with a germ pore, measuring 8 × 5 micrometers.  The stem is smooth and fragile, whitish at the bottom and brownish at the top, 2–4 cm long, 1 to 1.5 mm thick, and is equal width for most of the length, often swelling at the base.  The stem lacks an annulus (ring) and the base usually stains blue. The cap color lightens when it dries, turning a tan color.

Like some other grassland species such as Psilocybe semilanceata, Psilocybe mexicana and Psilocybe tampanensis, Conocybe cyanopus  may form sclerotia, a dormant form of the organism, which affords it some protection from wildfires and other natural disasters.

Distribution and habitat

Pholiotina cyanopus grows in lawns, fields, and grassy areas in temperate areas of North America, Europe and Asia. It can be found in Austria, Belgium, Canada, Denmark, Finland, France, Germany, Hungary, Latvia, the Netherlands, Norway, Poland, Russia, Sweden, Switzerland, Ukraine and the United States. It has also been reported from the United Kingdom but these reports are doubtful. Within Canada, it has been found in British Columbia and Quebec. It is rare where it occurs.

Edibility

Pholiotina cyanopus is hallucinogenic, containing psilocin, psilocybin, baeocystin, norbaeocystin and aeruginascin. Paul Stamets stated in 1996 that fruit bodies of P. cyanopus have been found to contain anywhere from 0.33 to 1.01% (of dry weight) psilocybin, 0–0.007% psilocin, and 0.12–0.20% baeocystin. A more recent study found a collection of P. cyanopus from Poland to contain 0.90±0.08% psilocybin, 0.17±0.01% psilocin, 0.16±0.01% baeocystin, 0.053±0.004% norbaeocystin and 0.011±0.0007% aeruginascin. Most mycologists recommend against eating this mushroom because it is easy to mistake with deadly poisonous species e.g. pholiotina rugosa, cortinarius gentilis, galerina marginata or galerina padulosa

Legality

The legal status of psilocybin mushrooms varies worldwide. Psilocybin and psilocin are listed as Class A (United Kingdom) or Schedule I (US) drugs under the United Nations 1971 Convention on Psychotropic Substances. The possession and use of psilocybin mushrooms, including P. cyanopus, is therefore prohibited by extension. However, in many national, state, and provincial drug laws, there is a great deal of ambiguity about the legal status of psilocybin mushrooms and the spores of these mushrooms. For more details on the legal status of psilocybin mushrooms and their spores, see: Legal status of psilocybin mushrooms.

See also
Psilocybin mushrooms
List of Psilocybin mushrooms

References

Bolbitiaceae
Fungi described in 1918
Psychoactive fungi
Psychedelic tryptamine carriers
Fungi of North America
Fungi of Asia
Fungi of Europe